Drift trikes are tricycles that have low-traction rear wheels with surfaces of hard plastic, often PVC. They are designed to drift by intentionally initiating loss of traction to the rear wheels and counter-steering to negotiate corners. They are usually ridden on paved roads with steep downhill grades, corners and switchbacks.

The origins of Drift Trikes come from California in the U.S.A. where enthusiast Marty Spellman built the original Drift Trike and a group of friends had him build theirs so they could race them on the hills of Laguna Beach, Malibu, Fullerton and more. As can be seen in the LA Times Newspaper clipping and 8mm video, these trikes and riders are similar to the enthusiasts of today. Marty is recognized by the following organizations and countries as the originator of the Drift Trike: Brazil (Kamikaze Trikers & Guiguinotrike), Italy (Drift One), Australia, Argentina, Chile, Mexico, Spain, Columbia, France (Federation France de Drift Trike), and U.S.A

Drift triking has a dedicated following and is quickly growing in popularity across the globe. The resurgence of drift trikes come from New Zealand, fueled by its on-going car and drift culture of 'boy racers' and car enthusiasts. Drift triking quickly began to spread to other countries soon after, including Australia, the United States, Colombia, many European nations and various other countries. In 2011, a non-profit organization called the American Drift Trike Association was founded in the United States, with the goal of promoting the sport of drift triking but has since disbanded.

Usage
Smooth roads are preferred to coarse chip-sealed roads, as coarse surfaces tend to wear rear wheels faster, create a rougher ride and even reduce drifting ability. Riders gather most of their momentum through gravity but many trike drifters choose to employ a freewheeling, pedaled front wheel, which makes for a more versatile trike. The freewheel hub allows the rider to pedal and obtain forward momentum but allows for coasting when not pedaling. Another means to gain initial momentum is to stand on the rear of the trike and to kick or push backwards with one leg. Operating speeds for drift trikes generally range between 25-50 mph.

Drift triking has become a recognized sport, with crews such as Drift Trikes Whangarei being sponsored by Red Bull. 

In Latvia drift trike is officially accepted as sport discipline under drift motorsports using same terms.

Design and manufacturers 
The slick rear wheels are commonly made from a hard plastic such as PVC. Proper drift trike wheels can also be created by sliding PVC or polyethylene pipe over deflated pneumatic wheels and then re-inflating them to lock them in place.

In addition to the slick rear wheels, the key design attributes of a drift trike include a solid fixed beam 'Go-Kart' style rear axle forcing both rear wheels to spin at the same rate (this promotes the trike to slide), a short wheelbase (distance between the front and rear axle) to allow the rider to initiate a slide and maintain the slide easily, a larger front wheel and smaller rear go-kart style wheels, a steering system with a large degree of lock to allow the rider to control the slide without spinning, and finally a low center of gravity to give the vehicle better stability.

Many drift trikes are home made or custom-fabricated by professional welders. However, certain bike manufacturers such as Drift Trike Factory, Huffy, Trek, Aldi's brand Crane, Airwalk, Triciclos de la Montaña and a number of other companies have commercially released children's versions, and Local Motors was the first to introduce an electric adult's version.

Drift Trike Factory located in Brisbane Australia in 2015 is one of the worlds original motorized drift trike manufacturers and parts suppliers. Drift Trike Factory supplies all of the parts needed to build a motorized drift trike, as well as supplying highly detailed drift trike frame plans for making a motorized drift trike. This original trike manufacturer continue to provide good service and quality reliable information as well 

BlackTop Engineering released the first adult's fuel-driven drift trike with a suspension system and "G-Force Bars". One of the biggest names in drift triking is Triad Drift Trikes from Australia, who have been manufacturing custom drift trikes for over 3 years.

Wolftrike released rental use drift trikes, after 4 years and 100 000 customer tests in indoor track what is specially made for drift rikes  

Instead of choosing to buy brand-name drift trikes from manufacturers, many enthusiasts have chosen to design and build their own. Generally, this involves using an old kids' bike or BMX and modifying the frame to fit an axle and seat on the back. This allows people to give their trikes their own unique look, while being cost-effective.

Kiting drift trikes 
Rather than gravity drift triking, some drift trikes use wind power from kites to move.

Motorized drift trikes 
Fuel driven drift trikes are gas-powered. With all the torque being applied to the rear wheels, it becomes much easier to drift at low speeds.

Laws and regulations 
Drift triking commonly falls within the jurisdiction of cyclist traffic laws. Many districts, regions, and countries require the use of helmets, brakes, a rear red reflector, and front lights. Some regions categorize them as "gravity" vehicles, where they are treated similarly to skateboards and street luges.

References 

Tricycles